is a video game character in the Dead or Alive and Ninja Gaiden franchises by Team Ninja and Tecmo (Koei Tecmo). She debuted as a hidden character in the PlayStation version of the fighting game Dead or Alive in 1998, and has appeared in all of its sequels and spin-offs so far, including as the main protagonist of Dead or Alive 3. In the games, Ayane is a teenage master of ninjutsu and is characterised by her complex relationship with her half-sister Kasumi, the lead character of the Dead or Alive series.

She is also prominently featured as a recurring supporting character in the Ninja Gaiden series since its revival in 2004 and has made multiple guest appearances in other games, in particular in the extended Dynasty Warriors franchise. Ayane is one of the most popular Tecmo characters and is one of Koei Tecmo's mascots, but has been a subject of controversies regarding her age and sexualization.

Character
Ayane is officially one of the "faces" of Dead or Alive. In the series' back story, Ayane was conceived and born as a result of the evil ninja Raidou's rape of Ayame, Kasumi's and Hayate's mother and wife of Shiden, leader of the  ninja clan. The Mugen Tenshin villagers allowed Ayane to stay, but disliked and looked down on her. Deemed a cursed child, she was forced to live in the shadows. Since they were children, Ayane and Kasumi were best friends. Ayane also secretly admired Hayate as a way of increasing her self-esteem. Hayate is portrayed as fond of her in return. Ayane never knew she was related to them until the truth was revealed to her by Ayame. Ayane's ire focusses on Raidou who both created and ruined her life, but she also became hatefully jealous of her half-sister Kasumi and her privileged upbringing. Ayane's belligent envy towards Kasumi is similar to the hatred Raidou displayed towards his brother Shiden.

Depicted as quiet and reserved, Ayane has honed her skills in an attempt to make others see her as more than a "child of evil". Her deadly fighting style has given her the nickname "Female Tengu". With the death of her foster father and master, Genra (Omega) at the end of Dead or Alive 3, Ayane becomes the strongest ninja of Mugen Tenshin's shadow clan, the secretive , and pledges her existence to assist in Hayate's task of destroying the Dead or Alive Tournament Executive Committee (DOATEC). Through most of the series, Ayane was a bitter rival to Kasumi. Ayane has a tsundere type personality, is fiercely loyal to Hayate, and admires Ryu Hayabusa, the protagonist of the Ninja Gaiden series. She later became one of the lead characters of Ninja Gaiden herself.

Design

Ayane is the youngest girl to appear as a playable character in the Dead or Alive series, having been introduced at the age of only 16. She stands at 5'2" and weighs 104 lbs, with a bust size of 93 cm (37"), and has one of the most distinctive appearances out of DOA women due to her unusually colored purple hair and red eyes. Her face changed slightly between Ninja Gaiden II and Ninja Gaiden Sigma 2. As in the case of other Dead or Alive 5 characters, her face and general aesthetics are noticeably different in this game, due to a more detailed realistic design style in comparison to a more cartoonish style of the previous DOA games. Team Ninja leader Yosuke Hayashi said "Ayane and Hitomi retain their signature spirits while  by a new look that reflects amazing beauty, grace, and a strong sense of presence." DOA5 director Yohei Shimbori said the developers received a strong if surprising fan backlash from their initial attempt at Ayane's breast reduction in this game, resulting in them reverting this change. Shimbori described Ayane as "extremely serious, but when she starts to interact like Zack or Marie Rose, she changes a little bit."

Ayane's fighting style is very different from the Tenjin Mon style of Kasumi and Hayate, being more flamboyant and based on pirouetting and spinning attacks. Her signature weapons are a pair of twin short swords named . Kasumi's clone Phase 4 uses some of Ayane's fighting style. Team Ninja founder Tomonobu Itagaki described Ayane's character and personality as much "harder" than Kasumi's, making her fit better in the "very hard-edged" universe of the Ninja Gaiden series. His successor Yosuke Hayashi said the image of Ayane covered in her enemies' blood can symbolise the intensity of Ninja Gaiden. Hayashi later requested for Ayane to appear in the Fatal Frame series.

Ayane's appearance of a "sweet girl" is misleading and hides her "devious nature". She wears a variety of mostly purple and black female ninja suits and other attires (including a schoolgirl uniform and a Carnival of Venice-style costume), often coming with a miniskirt or tunic and often featuring a butterfly motif (later even on her weapons). Among about 20 Ayane's outfits in the 2004 compilation game Dead or Alive Ultimate, one was inspired by the character Millennia from Kagero: Deception 2. One of her alternative costumes in Ninja Gaiden Sigma 2 also pays homage to Sun Shangxiang (Lady Sun) from Koei's Dynasty Warriors series. Her other wardrobe in Last Round includes outfits designed by Tamiki Wakaki, a destructible green dress in 2014 and a purple armor in 2016, as well as downloadable costumes based on the Clockwork Princess Millennia from Tecmo Koei's Deception IV: The Nightmare Princess, Fie Claussell from Nihon Falcom's The Legend of Heroes: Trails of Cold Steel II, Satoka Sumihara from Square Enix's School Girl Strikers, Cocona from Tatsunoko's Nurse Witch Komugi, Nene from Samurai Warriors, and Yukino Aguria from Fairy Tail, among others. Her default costume in Dead or Alive 6 is to feature an Assassin's Creed style hood, described as "a cool new look but keeping things as punk and pink as ever."

Gameplay
Ayane is often regarded as a top-tier character in many of the games she is playable in, especially in the DOA fighting games where she was noted for being very unpredictable and confusing for the opponent as well as fast and hard to counter. In 2016, Jeuxvideo.com included her among the ten most frustrating characters to play against in any fighting game due to her potential for "very destabilizing" quick attacks.

Previewing the original Dead or Alive for the PlayStation, Computer & Video Games opined she "has an unusual floaty kind of fighting style, but has some great moves. Her quick punches make stringing combos together easy, and her throws are great for hitting people into the Danger Zone" (an interactive feature within some arenas). In Prima Games' official guide for Dead or Alive Ultimate (a remake version of Dead or Alive and Dead or Alive 2), Eric Mylonas declared Ayane the "tougher of the two siblings" as she "brings strings of blindingly fast combos into play and has devastating holds and throws." Ayane has a major weakness in that she can not stop moving without becoming "an easy prey," and she may not be favored by those who prefer "huge, over-the-top moves," but for a "more patient sort, there's probably no better character in the game." According to GameSpy's guide to Ultimate by Andrew Alfonso, Ayane's key moves include her high kick—which is "a lot" better than Kasumi's—with another move so powerful "it's almost unfair to use it." He noted how she can be actually more effective with her back turned towards her opponent, despite the fact that the characters cannot block when facing away from an enemy. In his guide to Dead or Alive 3, he wrote Ayane is a very unpredictable and quick attacker, even more than in the previous games in the series, and should be played primarily for her backwards position, hers being the best such stance of all the characters in the game. Ayane's speed and deceiving attacks make her a "pretty good" partner for slower fighters for tag team battles, but her primary partners are other ninja characters.

In Prima Games' official guide to Dead or Alive 4, Bryan Dawson wrote that while in the previous games Ayane has been "one of the easiest characters to use and was very difficult to fight against," in this game she "now requires much more skill in high-level players, as her best attack as nowhere as dominant as they were in the past." She was rated overall 7/10. On the other hand, for Daniel Wilks from Hyper Ayane in DOA4 seemed "to have the edge in nearly every battle due to their staggering speed and ability to put together easy multi-leveled combos." According to GameSpot's guide by Matthew Rorie, Ayane is "one of the more devious characters" of the game, "capable of devastating speed and some ingenious little fake-out animations," but she requires "a lot more practice than is apparent at first glance." In GameSpy's guide, David McCutcheon wrote that "widely regarded as the [Street Fighter characters] Ken/Ryu of the Dead or Alive series, Ayane can be both incredibly cheap and remarkably skilled," as "rolling and spinning will work wonders" for the player's countering effects and one "can juggle enemies to endless amounts of pain." Ayane's move set in an early version of Dead or Alive 5 seems almost identical to this in DOA4, but she gained some new moves. In an official description of the character, Koei Tecmo wrote that "her mastery of ever-changing moves means her opponents never know what is coming."

Ayane's gameplay abilities in other games were regarded more variably. In the DOA beach volleyball games, Ayane has excellent technique and jump abilities, at the cost of poor defence, power and speed. According to Official Xbox Magazine, Ayane is "not exactly who you want to spike at the net or try to blow past blocks, but she's excellent at long spikes, digging, and soft dinks." As such, Ayane is most effective as a support, but she should not be paired with Kasumi due to their rivalry; to partner with each other, Ayane and Kasumi need convincing by gift-giving. In Ninja Gaiden Σ 2, Ayane's attacks (many of her Fuma Kodachi combos resemble her combos from Dead or Alive) and finishing moves are far faster than these of Ryu, but the player has to learn to dodge much more as she has worse blocking abilities. The official guide to this game by Prima's Bryan Dawson states that Ayane's short range and limited attack power "make her the worst choice of the three new characters for almost every mission" and "her only saving graces" are a powerful ninpo spell and deadly Flash Kunai projectiles. In addition, if controlled by the console in the co-op mode, the character "doesn't seem to know what to do in any situation." Mitch Dyer of IGN opined that a vastly improved Ayane from Ninja Gaiden 3: Razor's Edge is "a damn fine addition" to the game, where she is "just as capable as Ryu Hayabusa" with her "quick and vicious" melee attacks and explosive kunai projectiles, adding that she is "functionally similar to Hayabusa in terms of combos and skills, complete with a screen-clearing special move." Similarly, Retro Gamer described her simply as "a nimbler version of Ryu." According to X360 David Lynch all the "women" of Razor's Edge (Ayane, Kasumi and Momiji) became "just as deadly" in it as Ryu Hayabusa has been through the Ninja Gaiden series. In Fatal Frame, unlike the protagonists of the game, Ayane can not permanently defeat ghosts and her strategy relies on evasion.

Appearances

In video games

Dead or Alive
Ayane was originally introduced as an unnamed training dummy in the Sega Saturn version of Dead or Alive, before she became a player character in the 1998 PlayStation port, in which she is an opponent character in the practice and tournament modes (Ayane was later included in the Dead or Alive ++ arcade edition) as well as an unlockable secret character. In the original DOA, Ayane has had neither a written background nor in-game plot-line (according to the later canon, Ayane was sent to secretly follow Kasumi).

In Dead or Alive 2 (1999), Ayane joins in the Dead or Alive World Combat Championship as an assassin in pursuit of her half-sister Kasumi, a runaway shinobi who has left the Mugen Tenshin behind and been branded a "traitor" to their clan. Ayane encounters and rescues an amnesiac Hayate, who goes by the name "Ein". When confronting Helena, Ayane is accused of murdering Helena's mother Maria, but the assassin is later revealed to be Christie.

In Dead or Alive 3 (2001), her former teacher and beloved foster parent, Genra, has disappeared. Ayane, now the most powerful member and de facto leader of Hajin Mon, learns that Genra has been turned into a puppet by the DOATEC and its sinister Omega Project and realises that fate commands her to put Genra out of his misery. Achieving this, she emerges as the official winner of the third DOA championship. The introductory sequence to Dead or Alive Ultimate, accompanied by Aerosmith's "Dream On", was the first to hint at the origins of Ayane and Kasumi's enmity. Itagaki confirmed Ayane as the game's main protagonist.

In Dead or Alive 4 (2005), Ayane has pledged her life to her half-brother and Mugen Tenshin clan leader Hayate, in his cause to destroy the DOATEC for the suffering the company has caused the ninja clans. Ayane has a threefold stake in this plot: she wants revenge for Hayate being brainwashed in their attempt to realize Project Epsilon, and for the manipulation and death of Genra. At the end of the game, Ayane uses her ninpo ("ninja arts") spell to help blow up the DOATEC Tri-Tower.

She returns as a playable character in Dead or Alive 5, set two years after the events of Dead or Alive 4. Ayane follows Kasumi upon Hayate's orders, and later discovers that she is in fact really an Alpha clone. Ayane and Hayate learn from Helena that Victor Donovan and his new organization, MIST, plan to sell his Alpha clones as super soldiers to various countries around the world. They infiltrate the oil rig platform where Helena believes MIST's secret laboratory is hidden. After Ayane and Hayate kill Kasumi's clone, they breach into the lab, but Hayate is captured by Rig and Ayane is forced to flee. After Ryu summons the real Kasumi to battle and Hayate is rescued, they destroy the laboratory and Alpha-152.

Ayane is again a playable character in Dead or Alive 6. After witnessing Honoka utilize fight-copying abilities similar to that of Raidou, she keeps tabs on her, and eventually fights her in person to gauge her abilities. She eventually tries to capture Honoka to put her into protective custody, but instead ends up fighting Marie Rose, Honoka's bodyguard who recently became a friend of her. Because to this, Honoka ends up being captured by MIST while they were all distracted. Ayane eventually ends up working together with Marie Rose in a rescue attempt, but ends up being captured herself by MIST's head researcher, NiCO, who desires to revive Raidou. This causes a reveal that Honoka is actually Ayane's older half-sister. Ayane ends up sending Hayate and Kasumi a distress signal before being brainwashed by NiCO to fight against Kasumi, however, she is later brought back to her senses and fights alongside her family to destroy Raidou once and for all.

Besides the main DOA series, Ayane appears as one of the player characters in the beach volleyball spin-off games Dead or Alive Xtreme Beach Volleyball (2003), Dead or Alive Xtreme 2 (2006) and Dead or Alive Paradise (2010), pursuing Kasumi. Dead or Alive: Cronus, the series' prequel project which was intended to tell the story of Kasumi's and Ayane's childhoods and explore "the innocence and cruelty of children," was officially cancelled in 2010 after Itagaki left Team Ninja and Tecmo. Ayane was confirmed as one of the nine playable female characters in Dead or Alive Xtreme 3, when she was sent by the Mugen Tenshin clan to New Zack Island in a "mission" to find a certain "runaway ninja" and to bring back proof.

Ninja Gaiden
In Ninja Gaiden (2004), a younger Ayane (aged 14; she is 16-year-old in the DOA series) plays a minor role as a non-player character, serving Murai and the Shadow Clan as a stealthy infiltrator and courier assisting Ryu Hayabusa during his bloody vengeance. In the 2005 Ninja Gaiden Black edition, Ayane stars in the "Ninja Dog" easy mode, where she treats the disgraced Ryu as her pet and leaves him various items through the game.

In Ninja Gaiden II (2008), Ayane appears only in a cutscene near the end of the game to give the Eye of the Dragon jewel to Ryu, turning his Dragon Sword into the more powerful True Dragon Sword. Ninja Gaiden Σ 2, the enhanced port of NGII for the PlayStation 3, features Ayane as a single player mode's playable character in one level, which shows how she obtained the Eye of the Dragon and defeated the remnants of the Black Spider Clan. She is also available as one of three new alternative player characters for the game in a cooperative multiplayer mode, and appears in the game's prologue digital comic, The Vampire War.

In the original edition of Ninja Gaiden 3 (2012), Ayane only appears in one cutscene, in which she loans Hayate's sword, The Jinran-Maru (which translated from Japanese to English means Rapid Storm) to Ryu. Ninja Gaiden 3: Razor's Edge, an expanded version of the game, features Ayane as a playable character with her own new missions: a campaign involving the returning Black Spider Clan, as well as being available to fight alongside Ryu—like in Σ 2—in an online cooperative multiplayer mode. A new Chapter Challenge mode allows the player to attempt any part of the game using Ayane.

Ayane makes a brief cameo appearance in the comic book tie-in prequel of Ninja Gaiden: Dragon Sword (2008). She is featured in Zen Pinball: Ninja Gaiden Sigma 2, a 2009 pinball game for the PlayStation Network, and in the 2013 smart phone action card game Hyakuman-nin no Ninja Gaiden ("Ninja Gaiden 1,000,000 People").

Warriors
Ayane made her debut in Koei's Dynasty Warriors franchise in 2009 with a non-player character guest appearance in Dynasty Warriors: Strikeforce, where her Fuma Kodachi swords are available as the player's optional weapons. In 2011, Ayane's Ninja Gaiden Sigma 2 costume parts were made available as exclusive DLC for Dynasty Warriors Online during the game's first anniversary promotion campaign.

Ayane appears as a player character in the series' 2011 spin-off game Warriors Orochi 3 in her design and primary costume, as well as playstyle, from Ninja Gaiden Sigma 2. In this game, set after DOA4, Ayane enters another world, named Orochi, as she stars in the Siege of Hasedō-themed stage and joins Yoshitsune Minamoto's party to find a way back home, then follows Sima Zhao's army and helps them to locate and rescue the prisoners at Xuchang. Ayane returns—together with Ryu—as a playable character in 2012's Shin Sangoku Musou VS (which was abortively planned to be released in English as Dynasty Warriors Vs. or Dynasty Warriors 3DS), as a free downloadable content (DLC) character, once again wearing her Sigma 2 costume. In the 2017 crossover title Warriors All-Stars (Musou Stars), Ayane is playable by default, where she instead representing the Ninja Gaiden series to accompany the said series' original protagonist Ryu Hayabusa, rather than representing her original game series debut Dead or Alive, unlike Kasumi, Marie Rose and Honoka.

Other games
Ayane's classic dress outfit is included in the 2004 Director's Cut version of the survival horror game Fatal Frame II: Crimson Butterfly as an alternate costume for Mayu, one of this game's two protagonist sisters (the other one, Mio, may wear Kasumi's costume). It is also an unlockable costume for the character Kooh in 2007's Super Swing Golf: Season 2. In 2017, it was further added for players' avatars in Phantasy Star Online 2.

Ayane herself is featured as a bonus playable character in her own side-mission in Koei Tecmo's 2014 survival horror game Fatal Frame: Maiden of Black Water, where she has been requested to find a missing girl named Tsumugi Katashina. In 2015, a cartoonish version of Ayane was added to Marvelous Entertainment's fighting game Senran Kagura: Estival Versus for the PlayStation 4 and PlayStation Vita as a playable paid DLC crossover character, along with bonus costumes for additional price. Ayane was also featured in Honey Parade Games' Shinobi Master Senran Kagura: New Link in 2018.

In film

In the live-action film DOA: Dead or Alive, Ayane is a ninja assassin and Kasumi's former servant who is dedicated to seeking out and killing her, as Kasumi is considered an outcast to the clan. Ayane first confronts Kasumi before she flees the temple, then several times on the island. She has romantic feelings towards Hayate (she is not his half-sister in the movie, and neither she is Kasumi's), and initially believes him to be dead. Ayane fails to kill Kasumi but finds Hayate and aids him against DOATEC. During the film's finale, she saves him from a potentially fatal fall.

Ayane was portrayed by actress Natassia Malthe, a Norwegian of Malaysian descent, who was much older than Ayane is portrayed in the games. Malthe's Ayane uses a Japanese long sword and also wields two longs swords in the various promotional images in and out of character. Malthe said she has undergone "weeks of martial arts training in China" for the film. Tomonobu Itagaki later said he "wanted to have Japanese actresses portray Kasumi and Ayane" but the film's director Corey Yuen "believed strongly in his casting choices." Itagaki said he would have chosen Aya Ueto to play Ayane. The film's producer Mark A. Altman said that he "was such a fan" of Malthe being "threatening and enigmatic as Ayane" that he cast her in Dead and Deader.

Merchandise and promotion
Licensed merchandise items featuring Ayane include a variety of statuettes and action figures for the Dead or Alive and Ninja Gaiden series, including the figures by Kotobukiya, Multiverse Studio, Mr Big, Sega, Shunya Yamashita, and Volks. A high-quality statuette of Ayane came with the limited edition Japanese release of Ninja Gaiden.

Other merchandise include "3D" coffee mugs for Banpresto's arcade redemption games, posters, swimwear for women, 3D mousepads and body towels, wall scrolls, arcade sticks by Hori decorated with a graphic of Ayane and Kasumi (released in two versions, for the PlayStation 3 and the Xbox 360), credit cards, and Dead or Alive talking clock that was bundled with another figure of either Ayane or Kasumi. Dead or Alive 4 pre-order bonuses in Japan included "the most beautiful slipcase in the world" and "the most beautiful poster in the world", the slipcase having an almost-naked Kasumi on one side and Ayane in her standard fighting outfit on the other. More Ayane-themed 3D mousepads were released as merchandise for DOA5 in 2012 and 2015 (chest) and 2016 (butt), along with dakimakura pillow cases, as well as for the Senran Kagura collaboration. A life-size bed sheet of Kasumi and Ayane was offered as part of the Deluxe Edition of Dead or Alive 6 in Japan and there is a life-size 3D mousepad of Kasumi from DOA Xtreme 3.

Ayane was featured in a special edition of Playboy magazine in 2004. The first batch of the unreleased Dynasty Warriors Vs. was supposed to contain DLC codes for Ayane's judo and volleyball outfit costumes. Free downloadable costumes for Ayane were offered as pre-order bonuses for 2013's Dead or Alive 5 Ultimate at Amazon. First-print copies of Koei Tecmo's Musou Orochi 2 Ultimate (Japanese version of Warriors Orochi 3 Ultimate) were bundled with DLC codes for blond haired Ayane's special "Orochi" themed costume in DOA5. Dead or Alive 5 Last Round pre-order bonuses included Ayane's special "Ninja 2015" masked outfit at Amazon, Best Buy and GameStop, with an additional skimpy "Aloha" costume available at GameStop only. The game's fourth DLC season pass came with an exclusive costume for Ayane only, and a download code for an exclusive bikini in DOAX3 was offered to visitors attending Dead or Alive Festival 2016. Furthermore, the demo versions of Dead or Alive 5 featuring Ayane and Hayate as playable characters have been added as a downloadable bonus to the pre-order version of Ninja Gaiden 3 for the PlayStation 3, and the collector's edition release for both the PS3 and Xbox 360. She is one of the four playable characters available from the start in the free-to-play versions of Dead or Alive 5 (Core Fighters).

Reception

Praise and popularity

Since her introduction, Ayane has remained a popular face of the series alongside her older half-sister. Ayane was described as a fan-favourite by GMR in 2003, and was called "everyone's favorite purple haired ninja" by GameAxis in 2006.  In 2012, Angelo M. D'Argenio of Cheat Code Central, listing Ayane among the top ten hidden characters in fighting games, noted that she "is now one of the poster characters for both series, and it seems she becomes more popular by the day." Regarding the preferences of Dead or Alive online multiplayer players, Official Xbox Magazine wrote in 2005: "Of all the stats and figures, one of the most unusual is a rating for the most popular characters in America, Asia and the rest of the world. At the moment, Ayane is the most popular character to use by a long way." In QMI Agency's 2012 poll for the title of the Ultimate Fighting Game Champion, Ayane was the only DOA character to make the second round, as she defeated Morrigan Aensland before losing to Scorpion, the winner of the title. She was voted the DOA series' third most popular female character in Japan in the publisher Koei Tecmo's own poll in 2014, placing fourth in another popular vote in 2015.

Ayane become a popular character among audience of both genders for various reasons. Model and actress Jaime Bergman chose the "quick and bold" Ayane as a Dead or Alive 2 character she would partner with. While awarding the Annual GameSpy E3 Award to Dead or Alive Ultimate in 2004, Raymond 'Psylancer' Padilla wrote, "Ayane should be my new girlfriend." He later elaborated: "To be honest, I always thought Ayane was an uptight bitch with a massive chip on her shoulder. I always rooted for Kasumi in their feud. Then a funny thing happened when I saw the trailer for Dead or Alive Ultimate during E3 2004 -- I started to care about Ayane. Learning more about her story, her upbringing, and the root of her feud with Kasumi made me change sides." Kotakus Mike Fahey also described himself as "more of an Ayane sort of guy." In 2005, she was described as his favourite Dead or Alive character by James Mielke from 1UP.com. Featuring Ayane as a "videogame babe of the day"  in 2009, IGNs Chris Carle commented: "After that awkward goth stage in high school, not many people continue to rock the violet locks, but Ayane is different... she's hot enough to get away with it." "Kayane", pseudonym of the professional gamer Marie-Laure Norindr came from a mix of "Kasumi" and "Ayane".

Ayane was ranked as the seventh top fictional ninja in a 2009 list by Fandomania. In 2010, Mikel Reparaz of GamesRadar ranked hers, Ryu's and Momiji's guest appearance in Strikeforce as the 49th "most awesome" character cameo in gaming history. In 2012, Gelo Gonzales of FHM listed Ayane among the nine "sexiest ninja babes in games", commenting that she is "like Kasumi, only moodier ... about as punk as ninjas get, and carries a get-the-fuck-outta-my-way-or-I-snap-your-arm-in-two-places attitude," comparing her to Ellen Adarna. In 2013, Jon Ledford of Sushi Arcade included her among the ten best video game "ninjas" in all her roles, "whether she's playing volleyball, fighting her sister or helping Ryu Hayabusa save the world." In a 2015 article "The Truth About Ninjas", Kotaku's Matthew Burns included Kasumi, Ayane, and Mai Shiranui from The King of Fighters  among "the 'fan favourite' lady ninjas".

Numerous publications commented noted Ayane's sex appeal, often including her among the most attractive women characters in video games. Spanish magazine PlanetStation put Dead or Alive 2 among the five sexiest PlayStation games for any fight between Ayane and Kasumi. In 2000, German magazine Video Games featured Ayane in their "Console Pageant" article, rating her "VG Sexy Factor" at 85%. In 2003, Bryan 'Sir Crossforge' Johnson collectively placed her with the other Dead or Alive women at second spot on GameSpy's list of "top babes in games". The Polish edition of GameStar included her as one of 20 candidates in a poll for the title of Miss of the Video Game World (Miss Świata Gier) 2006. In 2011, Complex ranked her as the 14th best looking "sideline chick" of video games, stating, "Kasumi's cool and all, but we definitely prefer Ayane's cold and killer demeanor." That same year, Jeremy Render of Cheat Code Central featured her among the top ten sexiest female video game characters, where Ayane shared number six spot with Hitomi. Together with Hitomi as well as Kasumi and Leifang, Ayane placed tenth on the list "video game hotties" by the Spanish edition of IGN. In 2012, Kristie Bertucci of Gadget Review ranked this "underage ninja that can kick ass while wearing skimpy clothing" as the 19th "hottest" female video game character. Also in 2012, Ayane and the other DOA girls were collectively placed at number ten spot on the list of the "hottest women in video games" by Complex. That same year in Poland, Ayane was included among the 20 "sexiest girls in games" by Wirtualna Polska, as well as among the "sexiest game heroines" of the year by Interia.pl. Austin Wood of Cheat Code Central declared her the number one sexiest game character of 2012 for her appearance in Razor's Edge, noting her as a "remarkably interesting character given the somewhat shallow plot of the Ninja Gaiden games" and "how she was introduced to martial arts, the stories and rumors surrounding her birth and childhood, and her unique fighting style".

In 2009, Gelo Gonzales of FHM listed her among the nine "sexiest bad girls of videogame land", commenting that "with her cute suplada looks, this deadly ninja soon became a mainstay of the series. Dead or Alive is one of the pioneers of boob-bouncing technology, and thankfully, Ayane has the curves to take full advantage of that."  Some also commented on her breasts specifically, such as when Gavin Mackenzie of PLAY joked them to be two of the top ten best things one could expect to see in Dead or Alive 5. Ayane and Rachel shared the seventh place on the 2011 list of "most incredible chests" by Joystick Division. In 2012, ZoominGames rated Ayane's bosom in Ninja Gaiden Sigma 2 as number one in gaming. A poll for the most erotic girl in the history of fighting games conducted by Japanese web portal Goo had Ayane and Ibuki from Street Fighter share the 11th/12th place (out of 50 contesters) in 2016; she was sixth in 2018.

Criticism, controversies and fan content
Official PlayStation Magazine (Australia) criticized Janice Kawaye's English voice acting in Ninja Gaiden Sigma, stating "she whimpers away like an eight-year-old brat at show and tell." Az Elias of Cubed3 expressed disappointment regarding Ayane's limited role in Warriors Orochi 3. Ayane's portrayal by Natassia Malthe in the film DOA: Dead or Alive was panned by many fans and critics alike (even as, prior to the premiere, IGN stated that "DOA is HOT... and Nastassia Malthe proves it"). Mikel Reparaz of GamesRadar dubbed the motion picture version of Ayane as "White Girl Who is Somehow Also Japanese", Roger Moore wrote in Orlando Sentinel that Malthe's purple hair "makes her look even less Japanese than [Kasumi's actress] Aoki", and UGO.com wrote about Malthe's role as Ayane: "Defining Moment: Zzzzzzzz."

Some criticised the visual allure of the character, up to allegations of sexual objectification. Mentioning "the subject of unlockable gym slips for Ayane" in 2002, Edge magazine stated that while it "remains opposed to videogame censorship, the Dead or Alive franchise has certainly challenged the boundaries of taste in games." In 2009, Joe Newman of GamesRadar ranked the series of Team Ninja's controversial Sigma 2 commercials, designed to draw attention to the fact that the "notoriously big-breasted" Ayane was a playable character (one of which was called by Destructoid "the best and worst thing to have ever been created"), as the fourth most blatantly sexist game advertisement ever, adding: "God forbid a moment goes by where any part of her body might be covered up." Team Ninja's post-Itagaki head Yosuke Hayashi dismissed the criticism, stating in 2012: "With the representation of female characters in the Dead or Alive franchise, we've always wanted to make the girls look as attractive as possible, and that's something that's not going to change for us at all." Hayashi explained: "We are a Japanese developer, and we're making the female characters with our common sense and our creative sense. When you take that to countries outside of Japan, it tends to be very misinterpreted in some cases, people considering it sexist or derogatory, etc." The issue was also dismissed in 2015 by Team Ninja creative director Tom Lee, who said they as well as most of their "fans around the world don't share the same sentiments" as their critics.

As with Kasumi's, Ayane's age has not been listed in the Western versions of the games to avoid backlash regarding characters portrayed as underage; according to Itagaki, Ayane's age in Ninja Gaiden would "cause problems with the ESRB." Nevertheless, some outlets raised this issue and questioned the extent of adolescent Ayane's sexualization in the games (in Ninja Gaiden Sigma 2 players were even given control over the movement of her breasts through use of the Sixaxis game controller). Destructoids Jim Sterling has voiced concern about how a supposedly 14-year-old character (Ayane's Sigma 2 age) has such "huge busters", as well as joking they were "worried that this now means I'm a pedophile." In 2011, Nintendo of Europe decided to not distribute Dead or Alive: Dimensions in Sweden (this also meant the game would not be released in Norway and Denmark), apparently because of a local child pornography law encompassing drawn and animated characters (and despite the age of consent in Sweden being only 15). ABC News mistakenly used GamesRadars joke image of Ayane "with the newly attached pterodactyl head and wings of Metroid boss Ridley" as an illustration for their article while reporting on this story. Reacting to the Nordic ban, Sterling (writing for GameFront) called her a "big-eyed lump of grade-A jailbait" and added: "Would it murder the fantasy of the fanbase if the girl was canonically 21, despite still looking like an eleven-year-old hormone pill addict? Instead, 21-year-olds are designated as 'old' women in Japanese games, usually playing a villainous, antagonistic role compared to the sweet, innocent, sexually desirable teenager." He further wrote that his proposed practice of "bumping up the age be part of the localization process," besides helping to avoid "silly controversies like we've seen in Sweden," would have "the added benefit of narratives that are far more sensible — having Ayane as an accomplished ninja at sixteen just doesn't make much sense." Ayane became canonically 18-year-old in Dead or Alive 5. Regarding the other changes in DOA5, according to Kotaku, director Yohei Shimbori received a lot of "fan backlash from Ayane's breast reduction." Previously, one of her new costumes for Dimensions had upset some fans when the game was announced in 2010.

Ayane is a popular subject of unofficial dōjinshi erotic comics in which she often has sexual relationship with Kasumi. Despite a warning from Team Ninja that no more DOA games would be released for the PC if the modding community released DOA5 mods that are not designed for "good and moral" play, nude models of Ayane were quickly created by members of the forum Lustful Illumination. Ayane was featured through Monty Oum's computer-animated fan series Dead Fantasy from the start. A fan mod also brought Ayane to Ultra Street Fighter IV, mapping her over Ibuki, and another removes Ayane's makeup in DOA5 to make her look more like she did in DOA2.

See also
List of Dead or Alive characters
Ninja in popular culture

Notes

References

External links

Official websites DOA5, DOA6

Adoptee characters in video games
Dead or Alive (franchise) characters
Female characters in video games
Fictional assassins in video games
Fictional attempted suicides
Fictional female ninja
Fictional Japanese people in video games
Fictional martial artists in video games
Fictional kenjutsuka
Fictional Ninjutsu practitioners
Fictional offspring of rape
Fictional miko
Fictional volleyball players
Koei Tecmo protagonists
Ninja characters in video games
Ninja Gaiden characters
Teenage characters in video games
Video game characters introduced in 1998
Video game characters who can move at superhuman speeds
Video game characters who can teleport
Video game characters who use magic
Video game mascots
Video game sidekicks
Woman soldier and warrior characters in video games